EB Games Australia (originally Electronics Boutique) is an Australian video game, consumer electronics, and gaming merchandise retailer. EB Games mainly sells video games, consoles, and accessories for Nintendo, PC, PlayStation and Xbox systems as well as merchandise related to pop culture/gaming.

The company operates 375 stores in Australia and 41 stores in New Zealand. These stores operate under the EB Games and Zing Pop Culture brands. EB Games' headquarters is located in Eagle Farm, Queensland (a suburb of Brisbane). The company is a subsidiary of GameStop.

History

Early years
The first Electronics Boutique store opened in 1977 selling digital watches, calculators and small radios. The store was located in the King of Prussia Plaza in King of Prussia, Pennsylvania, a westerly suburb of Philadelphia, United States.  Australian operations commenced in 1997 with the opening of the Westfield Miranda Electronics Boutique store. New Zealand operations commenced in 2000 with the opening of an Electronics Boutique store in Auckland.

2000s

Re-branding
In 2002, Electronics Boutique Holdings Corp announced a global re-branding program. All Electronics Boutique, EB GameWorld and EB Kids stores were to be re-branded to the worldwide name of EB Games. The company stated the re-brand would allow EB Games to leverage its marketing programs across its multiple retail formats and better market itself as the premier source for interactive entertainment.

GameStop acquisition
Electronics Boutique Holdings Corp was acquired in 2005 by GameStop for USD$1.44 billion. This expanded GameStop's operations into Australia, Canada, Europe and New Zealand. GameStop's operations expanded to over 4,250 stores worldwide as a result of the acquisition.

Gamesman acquisition
In 2008, GameStop announced it had acquired The Gamesman (not to be confused with the Australian retailer The Gamesmen) which was at the time New Zealand's largest independent gaming specialist. The acquisition added eight stores and expanded EB Games' presence in New Zealand to a total of 38 stores, bringing the total store count to 308 in Australia and New Zealand.

2010s

EB Games Expo
In May 2011, EB Games announced the launch of the EB Games Expo a video game trade fair / convention to be held annually in Australia. More commonly known as EB Expo or EBX the inaugural convention was held at the Gold Coast Convention and Exhibition Centre from 15 to 16 October of the same year. The Expo is used by video game developers to show off their upcoming games and game-related hardware. Unlike E3, EB Expo allows members of the general public to attend.

EB Expo was moved to the Sydney Showgrounds for the 2012 through 2016 annual conventions before returning to the Gold Coast Convention and Exhibition Centre for the 2017 convention. For the 2018 and 2019 conventions EB Games announced EB Expo would move to the Melbourne Convention and Exhibition Centre and would be held in conjunction with PAX Australia.

EB World
In October 2011, EB Games launched their EB World loyalty program. At launch the program offered four reward levels with customers able to progress though the reward levels by earning points called "carrots" being when shopping at EB Games stores. EB Games stated the program allowed receipt free shopping, longer preorder holds and other additional benefits through continued purchases. With the launch of Zing Pop Culture Australia in 2014 customers were also able to earn points when shopping at Zing stores. The program passed 5 million members and a fifth reward level was announced, in 2017, with the level five reward tier being by invitation only to the top 9999 point earners each year. In December 2019 the EB World membership exceeded 6 million members.

Since the launch of EB World, EB Games has released a number of limited edition EB World membership cards as gifts or to commemorate certain events. EB World cards have been released for: the inaugural year of EB World, EB Expo 2012 and 2013, EB Games Sydney CBD store opening, PlayStation 4 & Xbox One console launches, Star Wars Day, Red Dead Redemption 2, World of Warcraft and to commemorate Christmas.

ZiNG Pop Culture
In July 2014, EB Games Australia opened ZiNG Pop Culturea pop culture retailer. The first ZiNG Pop Culture store was located at the Indooroopilly Shopping Centre in Indooroopilly, Queensland.

Workplace harassment allegations
In May 2015, four former EB Games employees accused an EB Games district manager of workplace bullying, sexual harassment, discrimination, racial hatred, intimidation, and unpaid worked hours. The incidents were alleged to have occurred in the Figtree and Dapto stores. The former employees filed complaints with WorkCover Authority of New South Wales and the Australian Human Rights Commission.

2020s

Store Closures
In January 2020, numerous news articles reported EB Games would be closing 19 unprofitable stores by the end of the month. Electronics Boutique Australia Pty Limited stated: “Like all businesses, we are constantly evaluating our property portfolio to ensure that our stores mix is in-line with the ever changing retail landscape. After careful consideration we will be closing 19 unprofitable stores at the end of January. Where possible, staff were offered the opportunity to work in surrounding stores."

Diversification Efforts

Despite these store closures, Electronics Boutique Australia Pty Limited stated "2020 will see EB Games continue to open more large format stores that combine the power of both the EB Games and Zing Pop Culture". These large format hybrid stores, include both an EB Games and Zing Pop Culture store in a single location with an expanded selection of games merchandise. The Sydney Morning Herald reported the diversification into games merchandise through the establishment of the Zing Pop Culture brand in 2014 had been vital in keeping the company profitable. The newspaper reported the greater focus on merchandise allowed the company to tap into the lucrative, higher-margin merchandise market of t-shirts, figurines and bobbleheads. The newspaper noted former staff agreed that the business’ merchandise pivot has been key to Electronics Boutique Australia Pty Limited survival in Australia’s tough retail landscape. However, they also pointed to the pre-owned games segment as a major part of its success. Electronics Boutique Australia Pty Limited has been the only profitable segment of the global GameStop for the 2020, 2021 and 2022 fiscal years. The company reported profits of US$9.4 million, US$52.2 million and US$30.6 million for each fiscal year respectively. All other segments of the global GameStop business posted losses in the 2020, 2021 and 2022 fiscal years.

COVID-19 Pandemic

Across the first and second quarters of 2020 due to the COVID-19 pandemic, Electronics Boutique Australia Pty Limited was the only arm of the global GameStop business not to report huge COVID-related losses, with sales soaring by 30 per cent. The Sydney Morning Herald reported the company plans to continue to open stores, despite other Australian/New Zealand retailers closing locations due to the pandemic. For Fiscal Year 2020 the company reported net sales of $US625.3 Million and operating earnings of $US52.2 Million. This was an increase of $US42.8 Million in operating earnings compared to the pre-pandemic Fiscal Year 2019 where the company posted net sales of $US525.4 Million and operating earnings of $US9.4 Million.

ZiNG Marketplace
EB Games launched Zing Marketplace in September 2021. Zing Marketplace was an Australian e-commerce retro gaming and pop culture marketplace which facilitated consumer-to-consumer sales through its website. Zing Marketplace was discontinued by EB Games on 22 March 2022.

Operations
As of 29 January 2022 the company operates 375 stores in Australia and 41 stores in New Zealand.

Atrix 
Atrix (formerly @play) is Electronics Boutique Australia Pty Limited's in-house store brand. Electronics Boutique Australia Pty Limited sells gaming accessories, Headsets, Mice and Keyboards under the Atrix brand.

Brand licensing 
In 2017 Electronics Boutique Australia Pty Limited began designing/manufacturing apparel and merchandise in-house using brand licenses. Merchandise manufactured by the company includes Backpacks, Beanies, Hoodies, T-Shirts, Pins, Socks and Wallets. The company holds licenses to design and manufacture merchandise in-house with DC Comics, Disney, Harry Potter, The Lord of The Rings, Marvel, Minecraft, Nintendo, PlayStation, Pixar, Pokémon, Rick and Morty, Scooby Doo, Universal and Xbox among other brands. The company sells these items via its EB Games and Zing Pop Culture stores and websites.

Pre-order bonuses
Game publishers obtain more pre-orders by including exclusive in-game or physical bonuses, available only if the player pre-ordered the game. Bonuses typically include extras such as exclusive characters, weapons, and maps. For example, EB Games included an additional avatar costume for Call of Duty: Black Ops when it was released in November 2010, and a pictorial Art-Folio for Metroid: Other M. Soundtracks, artbooks, plushies, figurines, posters, and T-shirts have also been special bonuses.

Pre-owned products
EB Games provides its customers either cash (if state legislation permits) or trade credit in exchange for customers' accessories, consoles and video games. Pre-owned video game sales provide EB Games twice the gross margin compared to new video game sales. Some video game developers and publishers have criticized EB Games' parent company GameStop for this practice, as they receive no share of the revenue from the sale of used games. GameStop responded to these criticisms in 2009 by stating that 70% of store credit generated by game trade ins was used to purchase new rather than used games, generating close to $2 billion in annual revenue.

Reboot Repairs
EB Games offers its customers console repairs and servicing. The company charges customers a set price regardless of the repairs needed. If EB Games is unable to repair the customer's device the customer is not charged by the company.

Starlight Children's Foundation
Since 2007, EB Games Australia has maintained a charity partnership with the Starlight Children's Foundation. Every year, EB Games runs a "Starlight Week" fund-raising endeavours across EB Games and Zing Pop Culture stores. In 2021, Starlight Week raised over $850,000 for the Foundation.

Corporate Affairs

Finances

Store Count 

Acquired by GameStop Corp. ("GameStop"), a United States-based video games retailer operating approximately 1,800 stores.

Acquired The Gamesman Limited ("The Gamesman"), a New Zealand-based video game retailer operating 8 video game stores expanding operations in New Zealand.

Launched Zing Pop Culture, a Pop Culture retailer.

References

External links

Retail companies established in 1997
Entertainment companies of Australia
Video game retailers in Australia
Video game retailers in New Zealand
Companies based in Brisbane
GameStop
Australian subsidiaries of foreign companies